Sandra Dawson may refer to:

Sandra Dawson (academic) (born 1946), British social scientist and academic
Sandra Dawson (cricketer) (born 1962), Irish cricketer
Sandra Dawson (runner) (born 1970), Australian runner